José Mendonça dos Santos, simply known as Dequinha (March 19, 1928 – July 23, 1997), was a Brazilian footballer.

The midfielder started his career in played yet for Potiguar de Mossoró, ABC (where he won the 1947 Rio Grande do Norte State Championship), and América-PE until 1950 when he signed with Flamengo. Dequinha was a key player during Flamengo's 1953-54-55 Rio State Championships campaigns.

He played the 1954 FIFA World Cup for Brazil and remained in the national team for another two years.

In 1960, he transferred to Campo Grande-RJ where he retired two years later.

Dequinha died on September 29, 1997 in Aracaju, Brazil.

Honours

Player 
ABC 
 Campeonato Potiguar: 1947

Flamengo
 Campeonato Carioca: 1953, 1954, 1955

Manager 
Sergipe
 Campeonato Sergipano: 1970, 1971, 1972

References

External links
 

1928 births
1997 deaths
Brazilian footballers
Brazilian football managers
Brazil international footballers
1954 FIFA World Cup players
Association football midfielders
Associação Cultural e Desportiva Potiguar players
ABC Futebol Clube players
América Futebol Clube (PE) players
CR Flamengo footballers
Botafogo de Futebol e Regatas players
Campo Grande Atlético Clube players
Campeonato Brasileiro Série A players
Club Sportivo Sergipe managers
Desportiva Ferroviária managers
People from Mossoró
Sportspeople from Rio Grande do Norte